Philip Reading Tannery, also known as Green's Barn, is a historic tannery building located at Middletown, New Castle County, Delaware.  It was built about 1780, and is a two-story, brick structure measuring 106 feet long by 30 feet wide. It is a rare surviving 18th-century industrial building that has been converted into a cow barn.

It was listed on the National Register of Historic Places in 1978.

References

Industrial buildings and structures on the National Register of Historic Places in Delaware
Industrial buildings completed in 1780
Buildings and structures in New Castle County, Delaware
Tanneries
National Register of Historic Places in New Castle County, Delaware